Silent Coup is a book written by Len Colodny [1938 - 2021] and Robert Gettlin that proposed an alternate explanation for the Watergate scandal that led to the 1974 resignation of US President Richard Nixon. The first edition was published in 1991, followed by an expanded second edition in January 1992.

The prevailing narrative is that Nixon and his high-ranking associates covered up a 1972 break-in at the Democratic National Committee (DNC) headquarters in the Watergate Hotel which had been undertaken to obtain information to be used against Nixon's political rivals. In contrast, Colodny and Gettlin contend that former White House counsel John Dean orchestrated the 1972 Watergate burglary. His motive was argued to have been to protect his future wife Maureen Biner by removing information linking her to a call-girl ring that worked for the DNC. The authors also lay out a case that Nixon's Chief of Staff Alexander Haig was the identity of "Deep Throat", the nickname for an important and then-unidentified source for reporter Bob Woodward. Woodward, a Naval officer before becoming a reporter, had briefed Haig at the White House in 1969 and 1970 and the authors suggest that Haig was a source for the reporters. In 2005 it was revealed that FBI deputy director Mark Felt was the "Deep Throat" informant who had become Woodward's key source after his partner Carl Bernstein was able to locate hush money paid to the DNC burglars in Miami, Florida.

Lawsuits

In 1992 John and Maureen Dean sued Nixon "plumber" G. Gordon Liddy for libel, after Liddy sought to support the core claims in Silent Coup. Liddy's testimony was the first time he spoke publicly in detail about the Watergate break-in, as he had refused to cooperate with investigators during the Watergate scandal. The libel case was dismissed without prejudice and was later refiled. In 2001 a federal judge declared a mistrial after the jury was deadlocked, and dismissed the $5.1 million defamation lawsuit.

The Deans also sued St. Martin's Press, publisher of Silent Coup. St. Martin's settled the case for an undisclosed sum. Len Colodny also settled with John Dean, and explained that “Dean agreed to accept a settlement and sign an agreement not to sue the author again on the same grounds because he wanted to avoid a public courtroom drama.” Although, “Colodny said he wanted the court to hear the case because he was confident that a public trial would validate his reporting.” For his part, Dean has gone on record in the preface to his 2006 book, Conservatives Without Conscience, that he is "pleased" with the outcome.

In 2001, former DNC secretary Ida Wells sued Liddy in the U. S. Federal District Court in Baltimore on bases similar to those used by Dean.  The court declared a mistrial, with judge J. Frederick Motz stating no "reasonable jury" could find in Wells’ favor.

References

External links
Silent Coup website
Silent Coup online book
Booknotes interview with Colodny and Gettlin on Silent Coup, August 11, 1991

1991 non-fiction books
1992 non-fiction books
Books about the Watergate scandal
Non-fiction crime books
Defamation